Punta Tre Vescovi (also Cima Tre Vescovi) is a peak in the Biellese Prealps, in northern Italy. On its top, three valleys meet: Lys Valley, Valsesia, and Valle Cervo.

Etymology
Its name (meaning "Peak of the Three Bishops") stems from the fact that the peak is the convergence point of the Catholic dioceses of Biella, Aosta and Vercelli.

Geography 

In the SOIUSA (International Standardized Mountain Subdivision of the Alps) it gives the name to a mountain group called "Catena Tre Vescovi - Mars".
The mountain is divided from the neighboring mount Gemelli di Mologna by the Mologna Grande pass. On the Valsesia side (NE) there are three small lakes (Italian: Laghi dei Tre Vescovi), while another one is on the Aosta Valley side (Gretie). 
Administratively Punta Tre Vescovi is included in the comuni  of Gaby, Rassa and Andorno Micca.

Access to the summit 
The summit of the mountain can be reached from Piedicavallo following E60 foothpath up to rifugio Alfredo Rivetti. From there the normal route attains the colle della Mologna Grande and then the summit following the mountain SW ridge. The Mologna Grande pass can also reached on waymarked footpaths from the villages of Gaby (Aosta Valley) or Rassa (province of Vercelli).

Mountain huts 
Rifugio Alfredo Rivetti (2,150 m)

References

Maps

 Italian official cartography (Istituto Geografico Militare - IGM); on-line version: www.pcn.minambiente.it

Bibliography 
 
 

Tre Vescovi
Tre Vescovi
Tre Vescovi
Province of Biella
Province of Vercelli
Tre Vescovi